CBS held the rights to airing the Cotton Bowl Classic beginning in 1958. It added the Sun Bowl in 1968, which continues to air on CBS as of 2022. From 1974 to 1977, it also aired the Fiesta Bowl, and from 1978 to 1986 it carried the Peach Bowl.

History

As the 1990s began, CBS' Division I-A college football coverage was reduced to its bowl game contracts, which it had with the then-John Hancock (reverted to Sun Bowl in 1994), Cotton and the then-Blockbuster bowls. However, it lost the rights to the Cotton Bowl to NBC after the 1992 game, leaving the network with just two bowl games to round out its college football coverage.

For 1995, CBS re-acquired the rights to the Cotton Bowl Classic and also gained rights to the Fiesta Bowl and the Orange Bowl from NBC. This was an important move for CBS as those two bowls would become part of the Bowl Alliance with the Sugar Bowl beginning that season; the goal was to try to guarantee an undisputed national champion in college football, something its predecessor the Bowl Coalition had also tried but did not fully succeed in doing.

Under the terms of the contract, which ran from 1995 through 1997, the Bowl Alliance games would be scheduled for New Year's Eve, New Year's Night, and January 2 with the last of the three serving as the national championship game. CBS would thus be guaranteed two national championship game matchups, with the Sugar Bowl airing on ABC.

CBS was the first network to air a Bowl Alliance national championship game, as Nebraska defeated Florida in the 1996 Fiesta Bowl (on the same token, CBS also aired the last Bowl Alliance national championship game, where Nebraska defeated Tennessee in the 1998 Orange Bowl to split that year's national championship vote as Michigan, which was #1 in both the AP and Coaches Polls going into the bowls, with the latter contractually obligated to name the Nebraska–Tennessee winner as the national champion, was obligated to play in that year's Rose Bowl). CBS also continued to air the Sun Bowl, but lost the rights to the Carquest Bowl after the game was moved from New Year's Day following the Orange Bowl's move to the home of the Carquest Bowl, Joe Robbie Stadium.

CBS lost the rights to three of its bowl games following the 1997 season, as ABC gained the rights to the Orange and Fiesta Bowls as the exclusive television home of the newly formed Bowl Championship Series and Fox acquired the rights to the Cotton Bowl Classic.

List of broadcasters

Blockbuster Bowl

Cotton Bowl Classic

During the 1980 game, CBS announcer Lindsey Nelson was stricken with laryngitis and had to leave the telecast after the first quarter. Sideline reporter Frank Glieber took over the play-by-play for the remainder of the game.

Fiesta Bowl

Gator Bowl
CBS Sports took over the television contract in 2007 and held the rights for four years.

Orange Bowl

Peach Bowl

Sun Bowl

As previously mentioned, from 1968 until the present, the game has been broadcast by CBS Sports. The Sun Bowl's contract with CBS Sports is the longest continuous relationship between a bowl game and one TV network.

See also
ABC college bowl game broadcasts
Fox college bowl game broadcasts
NBC college bowl game broadcasts

References

External links
Fiesta Bowl Numbers Game
Orange Bowl Numbers Game - Sports Media Watch

CBS Sports
Lists of college football bowl broadcasters
CBS original programming
College football television series